Jack Hui (born 1988) is an alumnus from Queen's College in Hong Kong. He is considered a prominent student because of the outstanding performance in International Mathematical Olympiad (IMO) and various national and regional mathematics competitions. Though accused of sexually assaulting an airline hostess, he was later found not guilty, and was admitted to the Faculty of Mathematics of Peking University.

Maths awards
Hui's talent in mathematics won him many medals and awards in different competitions. In 2003,  he participated in the Asia Inter-cities Teenagers Mathematics Invitation Competition, which was held in Fuzhou, Fujian, China, representing Hong Kong. His team won the junior secondary team and group event. He was successful in science competition too, winning the first class award in the individual event in the Hong Kong Physics Olympiad 2004. In 2005, besides winning a bronze medal in China Mathematics Olympiad (CMO), he was successful in the 46th International Mathematical Olympiad (IMO) in Mérida, Mexico, capturing a silver medal.

In 2006, he claimed the bronze medal again in the China Mathematics Olympiad (CMO). In March, he won another bronze in the Asian Pacific Mathematics Olympiad (APMO) 2006. Finally, he won another silver medal in the 2006 IMO, this time in Ljubljana, Slovenia.

References 

Living people
1988 births
Hong Kong mathematicians
Alumni of Queen's College, Hong Kong
International Mathematical Olympiad participants
Academic staff of Peking University